Fabian Keller (born 1 September 1982 in Schachen-Reute) is a Swiss former competitive ice dancer. With his sister, Daniela Keller, he is the 2005 Swiss national champion and a five-time junior national champion. They skated in the final segment at five ISU Championships – four World Junior Championships (2001–2004) and the 2005 European Championships in Turin, Italy. They competed in the original dance at the 2005 World Championships in Moscow, Russia.

Programs 
(with Daniela Keller)

Competitive highlights 
(with Daniela Keller)

References

External links
 

Swiss male ice dancers
1982 births
Living people